The Euro Millions Volley League (formerly Volleyliga Belgium and Ethias Pro League) is the top flight in men's volleyball in Belgium. The league is organized by the Royal Belgian Volleyball Federation. Noliko Maaseik is the most successful club of the Volleyliga with 15 national titles since 1991. The first Volleyliga was played in 1944–45 and won by Léopold Club.

The regular season is played by 10 teams, playing each other twice, once at home and once away from home. After the regular season, the six best-placed teams enter the play-offs, the first-placed team starting with five points, the second-placed with four, the third-placed with three, the fourth-placed with two and the fifth-placed with one. The last four teams enter the play-downs, the seventh-placed team of the regular season starting the play-downs with three points, the eighth-placed team with two and the ninth-placed team with one. The play-offs end with a final to the best of five, with the team finishing first of the play-offs having the home advantage.

2013–14 Liga A teams
 Knack Randstad Roeselare
 Noliko Maaseik
 Prefaxis Menen
 Topvolley Precura Antwerpen
 VC Argex Duvel Puurs
 Euphony Asse-Lennik
 VBC Waremme
 Axis Shanks Guibertin
 VDK Gent

Promoted: Gent 
Relegated: Waasland, Herk-de-Stad

2011–12 Liga B teams
 Avoc Achel
 Beivoc Humbeek
 Gea Happel Amigos Zoersel
 TSV Vilvoorde
 VC Global Wineries Kapellen
 VC Helios Zonhoven
 VC Herenthout
 VC Zoersel
 VDK Gent Heren
 Volley Haasrode Leuven
 VT Optima Lendelede

List of champions

See also
 Belgium women's volleyball Division of Honour

References

External links
Euro Millions Volley League Website
Association Interprovinciale Francophone de Volleyball 
Vlaamse Volleybalbond  

Belgium
League
Sports leagues established in 1944
Professional sports leagues in Belgium